The Saigol Group, also known as Kohinoor Group, is a Pakistani conglomerate company which is based in Lahore, Pakistan. The company was founded by Amin Saigol in the 1930s with a small shop that eventually developed into the Kohinoor Rubber Works.

Historical background
The Saigol family were originally farmers from a small town called Khotian, Chakwal District, Punjab, Pakistan. Khotian town was later named Saigolabad after this family. Sayeed Saigol moved to Calcutta in the 1930s and opened a shoe store. He opened a rubber shoe factory, and was a supplier of rubber shoes and raincoats to the Allied Forces during World War II.

Saigol, anticipating the division and independence of British India, moved his assets to Lahore in the early 1940s. After the independence of Pakistan in 1947, with the help of his younger brothers Yousuf and Bashir, he set up their first textile spinning mill in Lyallpur (now called Faisalabad) in 1949. Later the family expanded its textile business to Rawalpindi and Gujjar Khan, and bought a sugar mill in Jauharabad from the Pakistan Industrial Development Corporation. In 1958–59, the Saigols founded the United Bank Limited.

Nationalisation and back to privatisation
In 1972, Zulfikar Ali Bhutto regime started its nationalization drive and most businesses of the Saigol Group were nationalized over the next four years. By 1976, only the textile and sugar businesses remained.

Then under General Zia-ul-Haq's regime beginning in 1977 reprivatization of industries started. In the early 1980s, the Saigol Group started rebuilding and reinvesting after their losses due to nationalization of industries in Pakistan during the 1970s.

The group is now managed by three Saigol brothers: Tariq Sayeed Saigol, Nasim, and Taufeeq. Their sister Naz Saigol is married to Mian Muhammad Mansha Yaha.

Tariq Saigol, the eldest brother, is head of Kohinoor-Maple group, which owns the Kohinoor textile mills and Maple-Leaf Cement. He is known to be openly critical of the Pakistani government's lack of interest in the textile sector. Nasim Saigol heads PEL and Kohinoor industries. Rafiq, the youngest brother, takes care of the group's other business interests.

Companies
The group currently owns following companies:
 Kohinoor Textile Mills, Faisalabad
 Kohinoor Engineering Limited, Kala Shah Kaku
 Kohinoor Ghee Mills Limited, Kala Shah Kaku
 Kohinoor Ginning Factory, Multan
 Kohinoor Sugar Mills, Jauharabad
 Kohinoor  Textile Mills, Gujjar Khan
 Saigol Computers
 Pak Elektron (PEL)
 Kohinoor Energy
 Azam Textile Mills Limited, Lahore
 Saritow Textile Mills Limited, Lahore
 Kohinoor Motor Works, joint-venture with Qingqi Rickshaws
 The Four Seasons Private Limited
 Maple Leaf Cement (acquired in 1992)
 Kohinoor Oil Mills Limited (Delisted)
 Kohinoor Cotton Mills Liaqatabad

Formerly owned
 United Chemicals Limited, Kala Shah Kaku
 United Bank Limited

Family members
 Azam Saigol (1951-2018)
 Rafique Saigol (1933-2005), a member of the National Assembly
 Farooque Saigol (1936-2016) 
 Tariq Saigol (1948-)
 Iqbal Saigol (1940-)
 Naseem Saigol (1943-)
 M. Amin Saigol (1967-)
 Asif Saigol

References

External links
 Pak Electron

 
Conglomerate companies of Pakistan
1930s establishments in British India
Indian companies established in 1935